Bishop Airport may refer to:

Canada
 Billy Bishop Toronto City Airport, serving Toronto, Ontario, Canada (IATA: YTZ/ICAO: CYTZ)
 Owen Sound Billy Bishop Regional Airport, serving Owen Sound, Ontario, Canada (IATA: YOS/ICAO: CYOS)

Grenada
Maurice Bishop International Airport, serving St. George's, Grenada (IATA: GND/ICAO: TGPY)

United States
 Bishop Airport (Decatur, Texas), serving Decatur, Texas, United States (FAA LID: 76T)
 Bishop International Airport, serving Flint, Michigan, United States (IATA: FNT/ICAO: KFNT)
 Bishop Municipal Airport, serving Bishop, Texas, United States (FAA LID: 07R)
 Eastern Sierra Regional Airport, serving Bishop, California, United States (IATA: BIH/ICAO: KBIH)